Văcăreni is a commune in Tulcea County, Northern Dobruja, Romania. It is composed of a single village, Văcăreni. This belonged to Luncavița Commune until 2003, when it was split off.

Southwest of Văcăreni, there is a 218 metres tall guyed mast for FM-/TV-broadcasting and a wind farm is planned.

References

Communes in Tulcea County
Localities in Northern Dobruja